This is a list of seasons completed by the Kent State Golden Flashes football team of the National Collegiate Athletic Association (NCAA) Division I Football Bowl Subdivision (FBS).
The Kent State fielded their first team in 1920 coached by Paul G. Chandler and are currently coached by Sean Lewis. They complete in the Mid-American Conference and the East division. They were previously a member of the Ohio Athletic Conference from 1932 through 1950.

Seasons

See also

Kent State Golden Flashes

Notes

References

Kent State

Kent State Golden Flashes football seasons